Slobodka is a rural locality (a khutor) in Skvorchikhinsky Selsoviet, Ishimbaysky District, Bashkortostan, Russia. The population was 12 as of 2010. There are 2 streets.

Geography 
Slobodka is located 29 km southeast of Ishimbay (the district's administrative centre) by road. Osipovka is the nearest rural locality.

References 

Rural localities in Ishimbaysky District